Xiaming Street is a metro station on Line 6 of the Hangzhou Metro in China. It was opened on 30 December 2020, together with the Line 6. It is located in the Xihu District of Hangzhou.

References 

Railway stations in Zhejiang
Railway stations in China opened in 2020
Hangzhou Metro stations